St. Thomas' Church, Aslockton is a late 19th-century Church of England parish church in the village of Aslockton, Nottinghamshire. The church is Grade II listed by the Department for Digital, Culture, Media and Sport as a building of special architectural or historic interest.

History
The church was built between 1890 and 1892 by Sir Reginald Blomfield. The National Heritage listing however states that the architect was Sir Arthur Blomfield. It is Grade II listed and was erected in memory of a former vicar of Whatton, Thomas K. Hall, who drowned in February 1890 when RMS Quetta was wrecked off Queensland on her way to Thursday Island. His mother, Mrs Sophia E. Hall, paid for the church to be built.

The Quetta window on the north wall, showing the shipwreck, was designed by Michael Stokes in 2002, as was the east window, dedicated to Cranmer, with Jesus displaying his wounded hands to Doubting Thomas. The church has a single bell in a bell cote at the west end.

Parish structure
The church belongs to the Cranmer Group of parishes which consists of:
St Thomas's Church, Aslockton
Church of St Mary and All Saints, Hawksworth
Church of St John of Beverley, Scarrington
St Helena's Church, Thoroton
Church of St John of Beverley, Whatton
St Mary's Church, Orston

See also
Listed buildings in Aslockton

Sources

External links

Aslockton
Diocese of Southwell and Nottingham
Churches completed in 1892
19th-century Church of England church buildings
Aslockton